Ngãi Giao is a township (Thị trấn) and town and capital of Châu Đức District, Bà Rịa–Vũng Tàu province, in Vietnam. It is in the south of Vietnam.

Populated places in Bà Rịa-Vũng Tàu province
Communes of Bà Rịa-Vũng Tàu province
District capitals in Vietnam
Townships in Vietnam